Teh talua or teh telur (egg tea) is a tea beverage from West Sumatra, Indonesia. The tea is unique due to its use of egg yolk in its preparation. Chicken or duck egg can be used to prepare the tea. Other ingredients, in addition to tea and egg yolk, include sugar and calamondin.

A traditional method of preparing this drink involves stirring the egg yolk and two spoons of sugar or condensed milk in a glass until a batter is developed. Hot tea is then gradually stirred into the batter to combine the two elements. Calamondin (lime) juice can be then added according to taste, to remove any remaining unpleasant smell.

See also

 List of hot beverages
 List of Indonesian beverages
 List of egg drinks
 Eggnog
 Egg coffee

References

Padang cuisine
Indonesian drinks
Non-alcoholic mixed drinks
Hot drinks
Blended tea